Ivan Baryakov (born 26 June 1983) is a Bulgarian former cross-country skier. He competed at the 2002 Winter Olympics and the 2006 Winter Olympics.

References

External links
 
 Profile on ski.bg
 Profile as ski instructor in Bansko

1983 births
Living people
Bulgarian male cross-country skiers
Olympic cross-country skiers of Bulgaria
Cross-country skiers at the 2002 Winter Olympics
Cross-country skiers at the 2006 Winter Olympics
People from Bansko
Sportspeople from Blagoevgrad Province